Sir William Addis, KBE, CMG (5 September 1901 – 19 November 1978) was a British colonial administrator. 

He was Governor of Seychelles from 1953 to 1958.

References

External links 
 https://www.ukwhoswho.com/view/10.1093/ww/9780199540891.001.0001/ww-9780199540884-e-151619
 https://www.pfsr.org/history-of-seychelles/the-colonial-governors-of-seychelles-1903-1976/
 https://www.npg.org.uk/collections/search/person/mp95172/sir-william-addis

1901 births
1978 deaths
Governors of British Seychelles